Fatih Çeşmesi Nature Park is a nature park located in Eyüp district of Istanbul Province, Turkey.

Fatih Çeşmesi Nature Park is situated inside the Belgrad Forest in Eyüp. The area was declared a nature park by the Ministry of Environment and Forest in 2011, and is one of the nine nature parks inside the Belgrad Forest. The protected area is named, literally "Fountain of the Conqueror", in honor of the Ottoman Sultan Mehmed the Conqueror (reigned 1444–1446 and 1451–1481).

Ecosystem
The nature park has rich flora and fauna.

Flora
Vegetation found in the nature park are hornbeam (Carpinus betulus), sweet chestnut (Castanea sativa), sessile oak (Quercus petraea), Kasnak oak (Quercus vulcanica), nak Turkey oak (Quercus cerris), common ivy (Hedera helix), butcher's-broom (Ruscus aculeatus), blackberry (Rubus), (Smilax excelsa), cherry laurel (Laurocerasus officinalis), Chinese photinia (Photinia serratifolia), Syrian juniper (Juniperus drupacea) and catnip (Nepeta Cataria).

Fauna
Nearly 100 bird species and numerous mammals are observed in the Belgrad Forest. Some of the bird species are hawk, woodpecker, European goldfinch, magpie and passer. Among the mammals are deer, roe deer, wild boar and fox, and the reptile tortoise.

See also
 Ayvat Bendi Nature Park
 Bentler Nature Park
 Falih Rıfkı Atay Nature Park
 Irmak Nature Park
 Kirazlıbent Nature Park
 Kömürcübent Nature Park
 Mehmet Akif Ersoy Nature Park
 Neşet Suyu Nature Park

References

Nature parks in Turkey
Protected areas established in 2011
2011 establishments in Turkey
Parks in Istanbul
Eyüp
Belgrad Forest